The orders, decorations, and medals of the Canadian provinces, in which each province of Canada has devised a system of orders and other awards to honour residents for actions or deeds that benefit their local community or province, are in turn subsumed within the Canadian honours system.  Each province sets its own rules and criteria for eligibility and also for how each award is presented.  Most of the awards allow for the recipients to wear their awards in public, and most grant the recipients the use of post-nominal letters after their names.  Not all of the awards listed below are part of the Canadian honours system, thus some of them may not be worn or court mounted with awards that are part of the Canadian honours system.

Development
British Columbia was the first province to establish an award that was distinct to the province: the Dogwood Medallion, created in 1957 for the centennial of the province and its preceding Colony of British Columbia, and reformed into the Order of the Dogwood in 1966.

After the establishment of the Canadian honours system in 1967, the rest of the provinces, recognizing the Crown's distinct operation within each provincial jurisdiction, moved to establish their own honours after Ottawa declined to do so on their behalf. Ontario was the first, creating the Ontario Medal for Good Citizenship in 1973, and the Police and Firefighter's Bravery Medals in 1975 and 1976, respectively.

Alberta followed with the Alberta Order of Excellence in 1979. Quebec was the first province to establish a true order: l'Ordre national du Quebec in 1984. The Saskatchewan Order of Merit was established in 1985.

The Order of Ontario came in 1986, the Order of British Columbia in 1989 (which replaced the Order of the Dogwood), the Order of Prince Edward Island in 1997, the Order of Manitoba in 1999, and the Order of Nova Scotia, of New Brunswick, and of Newfoundland and Labrador in 2001.

However, the federal government did not recognize these honours and decorations, fearing duplications and citing the fact that, aside from the Order of Newfoundland and Labrador, the Queen had not authorized them. The provinces responded by stating that since provincial ministers did not constitutionally have the right to advise the sovereign directly, they would do so via legislation under the prerogative of the provincial Crown. The federal government finally came to recognize provincial orders after a compromise was reached between Governor General Ray Hnatyshyn and Lieutenant Governor of Saskatchewan Sylvia Fedoruk, wherein provincial honours established by legislation or order in council would be ranked below all national honours, but above national decorations.

Provincial and territorial orders

In all provinces except Quebec, the provincial honours are presented by the relevant Lieutenant Governor. The territorial honours are presented by their respective Commissioner.

Most provincial orders only have one grade, or level, which is membership. The only province that has a multi-level order system is Quebec: the National Order of Quebec has three grades (in descending order of grade): Grand Officer (GOQ), Officer (OQ), and Knight (CQ).

The Canadian Forces has listed the following orders to be worn in the following manner: National Order of Quebec, Saskatchewan Order of Merit, Order of Ontario, Order of British Columbia, Alberta Order of Excellence, Order of Prince Edward Island, Order of Manitoba, Order of New Brunswick, Order of Nova Scotia and the Order of Newfoundland and Labrador. However, the CF has stated that while this is the order of sequence on a ribbon bar, it is unlikely or even impossible that a member will receive a medal or an order from all Canadian provinces.

Various people who have been awarded provincial orders have been presented with national decorations and orders, such as the Order of Canada. An example of this would be Gordon Lightfoot being awarded the Order of Ontario. Lightfoot is also a Companion of the Order of Canada. Each province has a limit on how many can be awarded with their order per year: Ontario places no limit on the number that can be distributed (although it is usually around 25), Alberta and Saskatchewan are limited to 10 inductees each year, and the territories limit theirs to 3 per year.

Provincial medals
 Medals that are followed by the + symbol are not part of the official Canadian honours system.

Saskatchewan
 Commemorative Medal for the Centennial of Saskatchewan
 Saskatchewan Volunteer Medal (SVM)
 Saskatchewan Protective Services Medal +
 Queen Elizabeth II Platinum Jubilee Medal (Saskatchewan)

Ontario
 Ontario Medal for Good Citizenship (OMC)
 Ontario Medal for Police Bravery
 Ontario Medal for Firefighters Bravery
 Ontario Provincial Police Long Service and Good Conduct Medal
 Ontario Fire Services Long Service Medal +
 Ontario Award for Paramedic Bravery +
 Ontario Medal for Young Volunteers +
OBM Progress Medal +

British Columbia
 British Columbia Fire Services Long Service and Bravery Medals
 British Columbia Medal of Good Citizenship (MGC) +

Alberta
 Alberta Police Long Service Medal +
 Alberta Emergency Services Medal +
 Alberta Peace Officer Long Service Medal +
 Alberta Centennial Medal
 Queen Elizabeth II Platinum Jubilee Medal (Alberta)

Newfoundland and Labrador
 Newfoundland and Labrador Bravery Award
 Newfoundland Volunteer War Service Medal

Manitoba 
 Manitoba Excellence in Law Enforcement Award +
 Queen Elizabeth II Platinum Jubilee Medal (Manitoba)

New Brunswick 
 Queen Elizabeth II Platinum Jubilee Medal (New Brunswick)

Nova Scotia 
 Queen Elizabeth II Platinum Jubilee Medal (Nova Scotia)

Prince Edward Island 
 Queen Elizabeth II Platinum Jubilee Medal (Prince Edward Island)

See also 
 Orders, decorations, and medals of Canada
 List of Canadian awards
 Canadian order of precedence (decorations and medals)

Bibliography 
McCreery, Christopher (2008). “The Beginner’s Guide to Canadian Honours” Toronto: Dundurn Press. 
McCreery, Christopher (2005). “The Canadian Honours System” Toronto: Dundurn Press.

References

External links

Provincial and territorial orders of Canada
Provincial awards